Oneco is an unincorporated community in Stephenson County, Illinois, and is located along IL Rt. 26, north of Freeport.

Geography

Oneco is north of Freeport off Illinois Route 26 approximately 1-1/4 miles south of the Wisconsin-Illinois border, and is also one mile north of Orangeville. Oneco is in the Orangeville Community Unit School district.

History

This small town was settled in its present place because it was at the bottom of a basin, which helped protect them from the harsh winter winds. Native Americans came and helped settle the village, in an attempt to make peace with the settlers and have shelter for the winter as well.

References

External links
NACo

Unincorporated communities in Stephenson County, Illinois
Unincorporated communities in Illinois